Sirla Srinivas (born 25 August 1992) is an Indian cricketer. He made his List A debut for Andhra in the 2011–12 Vijay Hazare Trophy on 20 February 2012.

References

External links
 

1992 births
Living people
Indian cricketers
Andhra cricketers
People from Srikakulam